Walter Willis, Walt Willis, Wally Willis may refer to:

Bruce Willis (Walter Bruce Willis, born 1955), American actor
Walt Willis (1919–1999), Irish science fiction fan and writer
Walter Michael Willis (1917–1941), American Navy ensign and namesake for the USS Willis
Walter Willis (director), American film director of A Pair of Hellions